{{DISPLAYTITLE:C3H4O3}}
The molecular formula C3H4O3 (molar mass: 88.06 g/mol) may refer to:

 Acetic formic anhydride
 Ethylene carbonate
 Glucic acid
 Glycidic acid
 Pyruvic acid